10 Magazine may refer to:

10 Magazine (South Korean magazine), an English language monthly magazine published in Seoul, Korea
10 Magazine (British magazine), a British luxury quarterly magazine published in London, UK